Xanioascus canadensis is an extinct ctenophore, known from the Burgess Shale in British Columbia, Canada. The species, which is about 515 to 505 million years old, had 24 comb rows - in contrast to all modern forms which have only 8.

Other important Cambrian ctenophore fossils are Fasciculus vesanus and Ctenorhabdotus capulus.

References

External links
 

Burgess Shale animals
Prehistoric ctenophore genera